Bheegi Raat is a 1965 Bollywood film produced and directed by Kalidas. The film was a semi hit at the box office.

Roshan was the music director. Hit songs from the movie include 'Dil Jo Na Keh Saka' sung by Mohammed Rafi and Lata Mangeshkar in two different versions and  'Aise To Na Dekho Ki'  sung by Suman Kalyanpur and Mohammed Rafi.

The movie was a remake of 1957 American movie An Affair to Remember which in turn was a remake of 1939 movie Love Affair. This film inspired the 1999 film Mann starring Aamir Khan and Manisha Koirala.

Plot
Neelima (Meena Kumari) falls afoul of a greedy uncle, who wants to make quick money by selling her to the highest bidder. After a stormy escape, she's found in a ditch by Pushpa (Kamini Kaushal), an invalid and guardian to absent brother Anand's (Ashok Kumar) daughter. Neelima sticks around and soon has charge of the household and the kid.

Back in Bombay, Ajay (Pradeep Kumar) is the artistic layabout son of a wealthy industrialist, and is targeted for marriage by a scheming socialite, Vinita (Shashikala). After rebuffing her, he earns the wrath of her father, and his own. Ajay decides to run from it all, presumably with the help of his secret trust fund, off to paint in Nainital. Soon enough, Ajay starts meeting Neelima at various occasions in Nainital and eventually both of them start loving each other.

On the other hand, Anand also falls for Neelima not only because of her uncanny resemblance to his dead wife but also her caring and affectionate attitude towards his daughter. Neelima, who lives in Anand's house is torn between her love for Ajay and respect for Anand soon confesses her dilemma to Anand. Vinita, the spurned lover is seeking revenge from Ajay and soon gets an opportunity when Neelima gets injured in an accident. Ajay misinterprets the situation unknown to the fact that she actually has met with an accident and is filled with hatred for her.

By the end of the film, Anand who is all set to marry Neelima backs out at the last minute giving way to her marriage with Ajay. Neelima and Ajay unite and Anand goes back to London leaving his daughter in the custody of Neelima.

Cast
 Ashok Kumar as Anand
 Pradeep Kumar as Ajay
 Meena Kumari as Neelima
 Kamini Kaushal as Pushpa
 Shashikala as Vinita
 Rajendra Nath as Pritam
 I. S. Johar as Jhootlingam
 Hari Shivdasani as Colonel Bhim Singh
 Anoop Kumar as Kunwar
 Persis Khambatta
 Moni Chatterjee as Vinita's Father
 Ulhas as Dwarkadas
 Raj Mehra as Thakur Sahab
 Achala Sachdev
 Mridula Rani as Club member
 Rajan Kapoor as Sheth Ramdas
 Baby Irani as Munni
 Poonam as Nurse
 Sushma Shiromani
 Edwina

Crew
Director & Story – Kalidas
Producer – Kalidas	
Dialogues & Screenplay – Ramesh Pant
Cinematography	– A. Bhattacharjee
Music – Roshan
Lyrics – Majrooh Sultanpuri
Editing – D. N. Pai
Art Direction – Shantidas
Playback Singers –Lata Mangeshkar, Mohammed Rafi, Asha Bhosle, Suman Kalyanpur

Soundtrack

References

External links 
 

1965 films
Indian remakes of American films
Indian romantic drama films
1960s Hindi-language films